This article lists the discography of British singer-songwriter Cat Stevens. It also includes the albums he has released since he converted to Islam and adopted the name Yusuf Islam, as well as albums he released since he started being credited as Yusuf / Cat Stevens.

In June 1974, while in Australia, Cat Stevens was presented with a plaque representing the sale of forty Gold Records, the largest number ever presented to an artist in Australia.

Albums

As Cat Stevens

Studio albums

Live albums

Compilation albums
{| class="wikitable" style="text-align:center;"
|-
! rowspan="2"| Year
! rowspan="2"| Album details
! colspan="10"| Peak chart positions
! rowspan="2"| Certifications
|-
! style="width:30px;"| UK
! style="width:30px;"| AUS
! style="width:30px;"| AUT
! style="width:30px;"| CAN
! style="width:30px;" | GER
! style="width:30px;"| NOR
! style="width:30px;"| NZ
!SPA
! style="width:30px;"| SWE
! style="width:30px;"| US
|-
| 1975
| style="text-align:left;"| The View from the Top
 Released: 1975
 Label: Deram
| —
| —
| —
| —
| —
| —
| —
|—
| —
| —
|
|-
| 1975
| style="text-align:left;"| Greatest Hits
 Released: 20 June 1975
 Label: Island/A&M
| 2
| 41
| —
| 1
| —
| 14
| —
|19
| 5
| 6
|
 BPI: Gold
 RIAA: 4× Platinum
|-
|1981
| style="text-align:left;"| Morning Has Broken
 Released: 1981
 Label: Island
|—
|—
|12
|—
|5
|—
|—
|—
|—
|—
|
|-
| 1982
| style="text-align:left;" | Footsteps in the Dark: Greatest Hits, Vol. 2
 Released: March 1982
 Label: Island/A&M
| —
| 3
| —
| —
| —
| —
| —
|—
| —
| 165
|
 RIAA: Gold
 ARIA: Platinum
|-
| 1987
| style="text-align:left;" | Classics, Volume 24
 Released: 1987
 Label: A&M
| —
| —
| —
| —
| —
| —
| —
|—
| —
| —
|
 RIAA: Gold
|-
| 1989
| style="text-align:left;" | The Best of Cat Stevens
 Released: 1989
 Label: Island/A&M
| 4
| —
| —
| —
| —
| —
| —
|—
| —
| —
|
|-
| 1990
| style="text-align:left;" | The Very Best of Cat Stevens
 Released: 1990
 Label: Island/A&M
| —
| 6
| 22
| —
| 8
| —
| —
|—
| —
| —
|
 ARIA 3× Platinum
|-
| 1999
| style="text-align:left;" | Remember Cat Stevens – The Ultimate Collection
 Released: 1999
 Label: Island/A&M
| 31
| 10
| 12
| —
| 20
| 5
| 5
|13
| 11
| —
|
 BPI: Gold
 ARIA: 7× Platinum
|-
| 2000
| style="text-align:left;" | The Very Best of Cat Stevens
 Released: 2000
 Label: Island/A&M
| 6
| 6
| 44
| —
| 89
| —
| 7
|19
| 2
| 58
|
 BPI: 3× Platinum
 MC: Platinum
 RIAA: Gold
|-
| 2001
| style="text-align:left;" | Cat Stevens – In Search of the Centre of the Universe (box set)'1965–1997: 1: The City; 2: The Search; 3: The Hurt; 4: The Last 
 Released: 2001, repackaging 2008
 Label: Island/A&M
| —
| —
| —
| —
| —
| —
| —
|—
| —
| —
|
|-
| 2005
| style="text-align:left;" | Gold Released: 15 November 2003
 Label: Island/A&M
| —
| —
| —
| —
| —
| —
| —
|—
| —
| —
|
|-
| 2007
| style="text-align:left;" | 20th Century Masters: The Millennium Collection – The Best of Cat Stevens Released: 1 May 2007
| —
| —
| —
| —
| —
| —
| —
|—
| —
| —
|
|-
| 2007
| style="text-align:left;" | Harold and Maude Soundtrack by Cat Stevens Released: 28 December 2007
 Label: Vinyl Films
| —
| —
| —
| —
| —
| —
| —
|—
| —
| 173
|
|-
| 2010
| style="text-align:left;" | 4 Original Albums Released: 20 December 2010
 Label: Island/A&M
| —
| —
| —
| —
| —
| —
| —
|—
| 60
| —
|
|-
| 2013
| style="text-align:left;" | Icon Released: 12/11/2013
 Label: Universal Music
| —
| —
| —
| —
| —
| —
| —
|—
| —
| —
|
|-
| colspan="21" style="font-size:85%" | "—" denotes releases that did not chart
|}

As Yusuf Islam

Studio albums
 1995: The Life of the Last Prophet 1998: I Have No Cannons That Roar 1999: Prayers of the Last Prophet 2000: A Is for Allah 2001: Bismillah 2002: In Praise of the Last Prophet 2003: I Look I See 2003: Peace Train '03 / Angel of War (single)
 2004: Night of Remembrance 2005: Indian Ocean (single)
 2006: Footsteps in the Light 2008: I Look, I See 2 2014: The Story of Adam and CreationCompilation albums
2008: Various Artists, Songs for Survival'' (contributed one track—"Edge of Existence")

As Yusuf

Studio albums

Live albums

As Yusuf / Cat Stevens

Studio albums

Singles

As Cat Stevens

As Yusuf / Cat Stevens

Notes

References

Discographies of British artists
Rock music discographies
Folk music discographies
Discography